Dixalea is a rural locality in the Shire of Banana, Queensland, Australia.

Geography 
The Dee River forms most of the western boundary.

History 
Don River State School on 21 August 1916. It closed on 25 January 1932 but reopened in 1933. It closed again in 1952 and reopened in 1958 before finally closing on 5 June 1964. It was on Mcdonalds Road.

Dixie State School opened on 30 October 1923. In 1924 it was renamed Dixalea State School. It closed in 1938. It was at approx 120 Dixalea Doreen Road.

References 

Shire of Banana
Localities in Queensland